Alexander Cunningham  (died 3 September 1660) was a 17th-century English Anglican priest in Ireland.

Cunningham was born in Scotland. He held livings at Inver and Killymard; and was Dean of Raphoe from 1630 to 1660.

He married Marion Murray, daughter of John Murray of Broughton, Edinburgh, and had an enormous family (twenty-seven by some accounts), many of whom died young. Nine children reached adulthood, including-

General Sir Albert Cunningham (later generations spelt the name Conyngham) 
Alexander  
Margaret, who married the Reverend Alexander Montgomery, Prebendary of Doe, County Donegal: they were the grandparents of Colonel Alexander Montgomery    
Catherine, who married John Leslie, Bishop of Clogher, and had several children.

References

17th-century Irish Anglican priests
1660 deaths
17th-century Scottish people
Deans of Raphoe